The Battle of Sammel, also known as the Battle of Giri-Sumel, was fought in 1544 near the villages, Giri and Sumel of the Jaitaran sub-division in the Pali district of Rajasthan between the Afghan Sur Dynasty under Sher Shah Suri and the Rathore army led by the commanders Jaita and Kumpa of Rao Maldeo Rathore.

Background
Sher Shah had been secretly preparing for war with Marwar for four months. In 1543, Sher Shah set out against Marwar with a huge force of 80,000 cavalry. With an army of 50,000, Maldeo advanced to face Sher Shah's army. Sher Shah took the irregular path via Didwana (instead of Bayana), Kumpa had resisted Sher Shahs advance in Shekhawati, after which Sher Shah made sure to entrench at every stop and halted in the village of Sammel in the pargana of Jaitaran, ninety kilometers east of Jodhpur. He entrenched his army with the river Sammel in front of him as a line of defense. Maldev was surprised by the sudden arrival of his foe and led his army to Girri, which was 12 miles away from Sher Shahs camp, the scrub forest there gave protection to the Marwar army and thus both armies were well-entrenched. During this time the dispossessed rulers of Bikaner and Merta came to the aid of Sher Shah. Maldev remained in a defensive stance during this time as he was suspicious of his barons, Maldev had recently subjugated them and was therefore cautious about attacking recklessly. Sher Shah also knew that he was in a hostile desert with limited food and water. The digging of trenches had already taken a toll on his Afghan soldiers, who were not used to the terrain. After one month of skirmishing, Sher Shah's position became critical owing to the difficulties of food supplies for his huge army. According to contemporary chroniclers writing in Persian: To resolve this situation, Sher Shah resorted to a cunning ploy. One evening, he dropped forged letters near Maldeo's camp in such a way that they were sure to be intercepted. These letters indicated, falsely, that some of Maldev's army commanders were promising assistance to Sher Shah. This caused great consternation to Maldeo, who immediately (and wrongly) suspected his commanders of disloyalty. Maldeo left for Jodhpur on 4 January 1544 with his own men, abandoning his commanders to their fate.

Battle
When Maldev's loyal generals Jaita and Kumpa found out what had happened, they were worried about how they would prove their loyalty. When the king ordered withdrawal, chieftains decided that they would not leave the field even though they had only a few thousand men against an enemy force of 80,000 men, cannons and war elephants. Jaita said that the land they are leaving has been won and protected by their ancestors and they must not leave and flee. In the ensuing battle of Sammel, Jaita, Kumpa and other chieftains attacked Sher Shah's centre wreaking havoc in his ranks. Sher Shah reacted to the charge by sending war elephants and reinforcements under Jalal Khan. The Afghans soon used their superior numbers and guns to overpower the attack. The battle continued until the Rathores were slain to the last man. The Afghan victory was hard-won and gave birth to the famous Persian recorded quote about Sher Shah exclaiming that "for a handful of millet, I almost lost the Empire of Hindustan."

According to Satish Chandra - Sher Shahs oft quoted remark "I had given away the country of Delhi for a handful of millets" is a tribute to the gallantry of Jaita and Kumpa and the willingness of the Rajputs to face death even in the face of impossible odds.

In the words of Tarikh-i Daudi: "Some of the chieftains such as Jaya (Jaita) and Goha (Kumpa) and others, came and attacked  Sher Shah Suri, and displayed exceeding valour. Part of the Afghan army was routed, and a certain Afghan came to  Sher Shah and shouted in his native tongue 'Mount for the infidels are routing your army' Sher Shah ordered his horse and was ready to retreat when news of victory was brought to the effect that his men had slain Jaita and Kumpa."

The Rathore chieftains, with a few thousand cavalry,
had decided to stay back and fight in order to prove their loyalty.
Their cavalry charge pushed the Afghans back into their own army,
causing the death of many.

Aftermath
Sher Shah emerged victorious, but several of his generals lost their lives and his army suffered heavy losses.

After this victory, Sher Shah's general Khawas Khan Marwat took possession of Jodhpur and occupied the territory of Marwar from Ajmer to Mount Abu in 1544. But by July, 1545 Maldeo reoccupied his lost territories.

See also
 Rao Maldeo Rathore
 Nimaj
 Battles of Rajasthan

References

Sources

 Kalika Ranjan Qanungo (1965). Sher Shah and his times. Orient Longmans
 Mahajan, V. D. (2007). History of Medieval India. New Delhi: S. Chand
 Rottermund, H. K. (1998). A History of India. London: Routledge.

External links
 South Asia AD 1526-1757
 Giri Sumel War
 Battle field of Giri Sumel

Islamic rule in the Indian subcontinent
Sammel
1544 in India
Sammel
Sammel
Pali district
History of Rajasthan